Helix ceratina is a species of air-breathing land snail, a terrestrial pulmonate gastropod mollusk in the family Helicidae, the typical snails. 

This species is endemic to Corsica.

References 

 Fiorentino, V., Manganelli, G., Giusti, F. & Ketmaier, V. (2016). Recent expansion and relic survival: Phylogeography of the land snail genus Helix (Mollusca, Gastropoda) from south to north Europe. Molecular Phylogenetics and Evolution, 98: 358-372.

External links 
 Animal Base info
 Pfeiffer, L. (1845). Description of twenty-two new species of Land-Shells, belonging to the collection of Mr. H. Cuming. Proceedings of the Zoological Society of London. 13 (147): 63–68. London
 Korábek, O.; Kosová, T.; Dolejš, P.; Petrusek, A.; Neubert, E.; Juřičková, L. (2021). Geographic isolation and human-assisted dispersal in land snails: a Mediterranean story of Helix borealis and its relatives (Gastropoda: Stylommatophora: Helicidae). Zoological Journal of the Linnean Society

Helicidae
Endemic molluscs of Metropolitan France
Molluscs of Europe
Endemic fauna of Corsica
Gastropods described in 1843